Iran Football's 2nd Division 1999-2000 season was played in three groups of nine or ten teams each. The top two teams from each group went through to a final round, and the top two teams from that round - Bargh Shiraz and Esteghlal Rasht - gained promotion to the Azadegan League.

Second round results

First round results

Group 1

Group 2

Group 3

References 

www.rsssf.com

League 2 (Iran) seasons
Iran
2